Echinophoria is a genus of large sea snails, marine gastropod mollusks in the family Cassidae, the helmet snails and bonnet snails.

Species
Species within the genus Echinophoria include:
 Echinophoria bituberculosa (Martens, 1901)
 Echinophoria carnosa Kuroda & Habe in Habe, 1961
 Echinophoria coronadoi (Crosse, 1867) 
 † Echinophoria emilyae (Laws, 1932) †
 † Echinophoria grangei (Marwick, 1926) 
 Echinophoria hadra (Woodring & Olsson, 1957)
 † Echinophoria intermedia (Brocchi, 1814) 
 Echinophoria kurodai (Abbott, 1968)
 Echinophoria mozambicana Bozzetti, Rosado & T. Cossignani, 2010
 † Echinophoria oconnori (Dell, 1952) 
 † Echinophoria oneroaensis (Powell, 1938) 
 Echinophoria pilsbryi  (Woodring & Olsson, 1957)
 † Echinophoria pollens (Finlay, 1926)
 † Echinophoria toreuma (Powell, 1928)
 † Echinophoria trituberculata (Weaver, 1912)
 Echinophoria wyvillei Watson, 1886)

Species brought into synonymy:
 Echinophoria oschei Mühlhäusser, 1992: synonym of Echinophoria wyvillei (Watson, 1886)

References

 Beu A.G. (2008) Recent deep-water Cassidae of the world. A revision of Galeodea, Oocorys, Sconsia, Echinophoria and related taxa, with new genera and species (Mollusca, Gastropoda). In Héros V., Cowie R.H. & Bouchet P. (eds), Tropical Deep-Sea Benthos 25. Mémoires du Muséum National d'Histoire Naturelle 196: 269-387. page(s): 363
  Verbinnen G., Segers L., Swinnen F., Kreipl K. & Monsecour D. (2016). Cassidae. An amazing family of seashells. Harxheim: ConchBooks. 251 pp

External links
 Finlay H.J. (1926). New shells from New Zealand Tertiary beds: Part 2. Transactions of the New Zealand Institute. 56: 227-258, pls 55-60

Cassidae